Sarah Elizabeth Bedi is a British actress. She has worked extensively in radio, stage and television.

She runs her own theatre company, Baz Productions, alongside Catherine Bailey and Emma Luffingham. Baz Productions patrons are John Caird and Dame Harriet Walter.

Bedi trained at Bristol Old Vic Theatre School.

Acting career 
Sarah Bedi was born Sarah Elizabeth Bedi she started acting at the age of 15 when she took a lead role in the original cast of The Late Middle Classes (under the name 'Sam Bedi')  directed by Harold Pinter and written by Simon Gray. Pinter wrote about Bedi in his introduction to Simon Gray's Key Plays, "The enterprise began with a miracle of casting. The central role (a thirteen-year-old boy) we found very difficult to cast. Suddenly we stumbled upon a fifteen-year-old girl (Sarah Bedi) who passed as a good-looking thirteen-year-old boy. She was wonderful; precise, contained, mysterious."

Television appearances have included: Holby City, The Bill and Casualty. She played Agnes D`Esterre in ITV's production of Affinity directed by Tim Fywell. 

She has worked widely on the stage including the Royal National Theatre, the Finborough Theatre and Theatre 503. From 2007-2009 Bedi was part of The Factory Theatre Company. She starred as Yasmin in I am Superhero directed by Lucy Kerbal and Louise in Cradle Me with Sharon Maughan and Luke Treadaway, directed by Duncan Mcmillan. She won a Critics' Award for Theatre in Scotland for Best Ensemble as part of the cast of The Three Musketeers and the Princess of Spain directed by Dominic Hill (Traverse Theatre Company/Belgrade Theatre, Coventry/English Touring Theatre).

References

External links 
 
 Critics Award for Theatre in Scotland,

Living people
Year of birth missing (living people)
British actresses